Ena Lake is a lake in the Canadian province of Saskatchewan, located near the boundary with the Northwest Territories. The lake hosts several islands, including Gillis Island.  The Ena Lake Lodge is located on the lake and is accessible by float plane.

See also
List of lakes of Saskatchewan

References

External links
 Ena Lake Lodge

Lakes of Saskatchewan